Dexter Price Filkins (born May 24, 1961) is an American journalist known primarily for his coverage of the wars in Iraq and Afghanistan for The New York Times. He was a finalist for a Pulitzer Prize in 2002 for his dispatches from Afghanistan, and won a Pulitzer in 2009 as part of a team of Times reporters for their dispatches from Pakistan and Afghanistan. He has been called "the premier combat journalist of his generation". He currently writes for The New Yorker.

Background
Filkins received a B.A. in political science from the University of Florida  in 1983, and a Master of Philosophy in international relations from Oxford University (1984), where he was a student of St Antony's College.

Career
Before joining the Times in September 2000, Filkins was New Delhi bureau chief for the Los Angeles Times for three years. He reported from The New York Times Baghdad bureau in Iraq from 2003 to 2006.

In 2006–2007, Filkins was at Harvard University on a Nieman Fellowship; in 2007–2008, he was a Fellow at the Carr Center for Human Rights Policy at the Harvard Kennedy School.

Filkins's book, The Forever War (2008), chronicling his experiences in Afghanistan and Iraq, was a New York Times best-seller. The Forever War won the National Book Critics Circle Award for best nonfiction book of 2008, and was named one of the best nonfiction books of the year by, among others, The New York Times, Amazon.com, The Washington Post, Time, and the Boston Globe.

Filkins joined The New Yorker in 2011.

Awards
Filkins has received two George Polk Awards, given annually by Long Island University to honor contributions to journalistic integrity and investigative reporting. He was cited for his reports from the assault on Fallujah, Iraq, in November 2004, when the Marine company he travelled with lost a quarter of its men in eight days. In 2011, Filkins and The New York Times colleague Mark Mazzetti won for their reporting on Afghanistan and Pakistan.

Filkins has won two National Magazine Awards; in 2009, for his story, "Right At the Edge,"  and in 2011 for "Bedrooms of the Fallen," an essay with the photographer Ashley Gilbertson. Both appeared in the New York Times Magazine.

Filkins' article "Right at the Edge" (September 7, 2008) was part of the body of work by the staff of The New York Times awarded the 2009 Pulitzer Prize for distinguished reporting on international affairs.

In 2010, his reporting for The New York Times from Iraq and Afghanistan, alongside the work of photographer Tyler Hicks and reporter C. J. Chivers, was selected by New York University as one of the "Top Ten Works of Journalism of the Decade".

Bibliography

Books

Essays and reporting
 
 
 
 
 
 
 
 
 
 
 
 
 
  Mosul Dam.
 
 
 

———————
Notes

References

External links

"Right at the Edge'" at Pulitzer.org
"My Long War"' August 22, 2008 by Dexter Filkins for the New York Times Magazine

C-SPAN Q&A, April 24, 2005

"Q&A" about "The Forever War"
Authors@Google One-hour video talk with Dexter Filkins (September 24, 2008)

1961 births
Living people
American male journalists
American people of the Iraq War
American war correspondents
George Polk Award recipients
International Herald Tribune people
Los Angeles Times people
Nieman Fellows
Place of birth missing (living people)
The New York Times writers
The New Yorker staff writers
University of Florida College of Liberal Arts and Sciences alumni
War correspondents of the Iraq War
War correspondents of the War in Afghanistan (2001–2021)
Alumni of St Antony's College, Oxford